Christopher Matthew Kerze (February 19, 1973 - disappeared April 20, 1990) is a missing American teenager from Eagan, Minnesota who was last seen on April 20, 1990. His abandoned vehicle was found two days after his disappearance. He is one of the many missing people featured in Soul Asylum's music video for "Runaway Train".

Disappearance
On April 20, 1990, Kerze reportedly stayed home from school indicating that he was sick. The family vehicle, a blue 1988 Dodge Caravan, was missing when his parents returned home later that day. They found a note from Kerze stating that he would be back by 6 p.m. unless he got lost – which was unusual, as the word lost was underlined twice on the note. At the time of his disappearance Christopher was wearing a light denim blue trench coat, a size large black sweatshirt, size 29M Bugle Boy brand blue jeans, a black leather belt, and size 30 JC Penney brand underwear with a blue stripe on the elastic band, brown leather boat shoes in size 11, white crew socks, a black Swatch watch, and a black bi-fold leather wallet with his Minnesota driver’s license.   The family then received a letter from Duluth, Minnesota on April 21, 1990 saying that Kerze had lied about being sick in order to gain usage of the van and go "to not even I know where." The note further stated that he intended to end his life and apologized for this to his loved ones. 
Kerze had an O.F. Mossberg & Sons 20-gauge shotgun with him, although he had not taken any ammunition.  Authorities have speculated that he may have discarded the gun but they are not certain of that.  The van was located abandoned two days later on April 22, 1990, near Grand Rapids, Minnesota.

Searching for Christopher 

After his disappearance, posters were distributed and extensive searches were made in an attempt to find Kerze. In 2004, an anonymous letter was received by the Eagan Police Department suggesting they should stop trying to find Kerze and he would return home when he is ready.  The police were unable to authenticate the communication, and decided that it had been a hoax.

A week after Christopher's disappearance, his parents began receiving a series of very strange phonecalls. When they answered the phone there was a lot of noise on the other end, like a party, and when they tried to talk or ask who it was they would hang up. Christopher's neighbor and best friend also began receiving these types of strange phonecalls. Mrs. Kerze maintains that it was her son, because they had never had that kind of event before. After six months, those calls stopped abruptly, and no new leads were obtained.

In 1993, the alternative rock band Soul Asylum released the song "Runaway Train". The music video for the song featured information and pictures of missing children with Christopher being featured in the American version.

There was renewed interest in the case in late 2016 after Jacob Wetterling's case was resolved.  New age-progressed photos of Kerze were created and missing persons posters were distributed with those photos.  The family also gave media interviews regarding the case.

See also
List of people who disappeared

References

External links

1973 births
Possibly living people
1990s missing person cases
Missing American children
Missing person cases in Minnesota
People from Eagan, Minnesota